Three Musketeers is an abstract strategy board game by Haar Hoolim.  It was published in Sid Sackson's A Gamut of Games.  The game is notable in that, like the traditional fox and geese, it uses the principle of unequal forces; the two players neither use the same types of pieces nor the same rules, and their victory conditions are different.

Equipment
 Twenty-five tokens (such as checkers or poker chips), twenty-two light and three dark.
 A board marked out as a 5 by 5 grid.

Rules
One player takes the part of the three musketeers, the other of Cardinal Richelieu's men ("the enemy"). The musketeer player sets up their tokens in two opposite corners and in the center space; the enemy places tokens in all remaining board spaces:

The players take turns moving one piece; the musketeer player starts.  The rules are as follows:

The musketeer player can move a musketeer to any orthogonally (non-diagonal) adjacent space occupied by an enemy; the enemy piece is removed from the game.
The enemy can move one enemy piece to any orthogonally adjacent empty space.

The enemy wins if it can force the three musketeers to be all on the same row or column.

The musketeers win if on their turn they cannot move due to there being no enemy pieces adjacent to any musketeer and they are not all on the same row or column.  As long as one musketeer can move, the game is not won.

References 

Sackson, Sid.  A Gamut of Games.

External links

Board games introduced in 1969
Abstract strategy games
Solved games
Cultural depictions of Cardinal Richelieu